Robin Mikael Söder (born 1 April 1991) is a Swedish former professional footballer who played as a forward. He spent the majority of his professional career at IFK Göteborg, but also represented Esbjerg fB in Denmark and Lokeren in Belgium. He won one cap for the Sweden national team in 2020.

Club career

Early career
Söder began his football career 1995 in Magra IS. After a couple of years, he started to play for Sollebrunn AIK. He moved out from Magra at the age of 12 and started to play for Morlanda GoIF in Orust. He changed club to Stenungsunds IF, where he also played senior football.

IFK Göteborg
Söder was signed for the youth team of the Swedish champions IFK Göteborg in December 2007, but soon began to train and play with the senior squad.

He made his debut in Allsvenskan on 1 July 2008 when he came on as a substitute against Trelleborgs FF. Only eleven days later, he made his first Allsvenskan goal for the club, securing three points against Djurgårdens IF by scoring 2–1 in the 91st minute.

After his debut season he was awarded Newcomer of the Year at the annual Fotbollsgalan, beating Sebastian Rajalakso, Rasmus Jönsson and Joel Ekstrand.

Esbjerg fB
After six seasons in IFK Göteborg, Söder decided to move to Danish side Esbjerg fB on 22 August 2014. He signed a three-year contract. After scoring 9 goals in 11 matches during the 2016–17 season, he was mentioned as a potential player for the national team by national team manager Janne Andersson.

Lokeren
On 22 May 2017, Söder joined Belgian First Division A club Lokeren on a free transfer. He signed a three-year contract.

Return to IFK Göteborg and retirement 
On 10 August 2018, Söder returned to his old club IFK Göteborg, signing a three-and-a-half-year contract. On 24 February 2019, he was voted as 2018 Årets ärkeängel (Archangel of the Year), an award given to a player who is considered to have shown great loyalty to the club.

In the 2019 season, Söder became the top scorer of the club with 14 goals in Allsvenskan, one goal less than top scorer Mohamed Buya Turay. For his performances during 2019, he was awarded Kristallkulan (The Crystal Ball), given to the best player in West Sweden. Following the departure of Lasse Vibe, Söder was chosen as club-captain at the start of the 2020 season. When Marcus Berg returned to the club in July 2021, he took over the captaincy from Söder. Söder was instead picked as vice-captain.

On 26 November 2021, it was announced that Söder would leave IFK Göteborg after the season, when his contract expired. He played his last game for the club two days later against Östersunds FK. On 11 January 2022, he officially retired from professional football and began working as a scout for IFK Göteborg.

International career

Youth 

Söder was a regular in the Swedish national youth teams, and he was the captain of the Swedish U17 team in 2 matches in 2007. He became the youngest person ever to play in the Swedish U21 team, being 17 years and 157 days old when he played against Poland on 5 September 2008. The record was previously held by Leif Eriksson, who was 17 years and 212 days when he made his debut in 1959.

On 23 May 2009, he was selected for the Swedish squad competing in the 2009 UEFA European Under-21 Championship. Söder played one game in this tournament, coming as a substitute in the semi-final against England. He assisted Marcus Berg to the 3–3 equaliser. In the overtime that followed, he suffered a serious ligament injury.

Senior 
After his successful 2019 season, Söder was called up to the national team by Janne Andersson for the friendly games against Moldova and Kosovo in January 2020. He made his senior debut for Sweden against Kosovo on 12 January 2020, a game in which he was captain.

Career statistics

Club

International

Honours

Stenungsunds IF
Division 4 Bohuslän/Dalsland: 2006

IFK Göteborg
Svenska Cupen: 2008, 2012–13, 2019–20

Individual
Swedish Newcomer of the Year: 2008
Årets ärkeängel (IFK Göteborg player who have shown great loyalty to the club): 2018
Kristallkulan (best player in West Sweden): 2019

References

External links
 

1991 births
Living people
Association football forwards
Association football wingers
Swedish footballers
Swedish expatriate footballers
Sweden under-21 international footballers
Sweden youth international footballers
Allsvenskan players
Danish Superliga players
Belgian Pro League players
IFK Göteborg players
Esbjerg fB players
K.S.C. Lokeren Oost-Vlaanderen players
Expatriate men's footballers in Denmark
Expatriate footballers in Belgium